Lieutenant-Colonel Sir Randolf Littlehales Baker, 4th Baronet,  (20 July 1879 – 23 July 1959) was a British Conservative Party politician.

Background
He was the son of Reverend Sir Talbot Hastings Bendall Baker, 3rd Bt. and Amy Susan Marryat. He succeeded to the Baronetcy on his father's death on 6 April 1900. The family owned the Ranston Estate in Dorset including the Grade 1 listed Ranston manor house.

Army career
He served in the Dorset Yeomanry, attaining the rank of lieutenant-colonel and being awarded the Territorial Decoration. He fought in the First World War, where he was mentioned in despatches and wounded in 1915. He served in the Dardanelles, from July to October 1915, when he acted as a military landing officer on A Beach East, Suvla Bay; then as second in command of his regiment in Egypt from March 1916 to March 1917, and finally as commanding officer during the Palestine campaign from March to October 1917, including the 1st and 2nd Battles of Gaza. He was awarded the Distinguished Service Order (D.S.O.) (and bar) in 1918. He continued his army career after the end of the war, ultimately being promoted to lieutenant general.

Political career
He sat as Conservative Party MP for Dorset North from January 1910 to December 1918. Having lost to the Liberal candidate in the 1905 by-election and 1906 general election, Baker was first elected at the January 1910 general election, when he gained the seat from the Liberals. He retained his seat in the December 1910 general election.

Personal life
Sir Randolf married, firstly, Elsie Burrell, daughter of Robert George Burrell, on 29 June 1920. He married, secondly, Mary Caroline Orlebar, daughter of Augustus Scobell Orlebar, on 8 October 1955. He had one daughter Selina Littlehales Baker (1925–2010) by his first wife. She married William Harry Gibson Fleming.

He died on 23 July 1959 at age 80. As he had no sons, the baronetcy became extinct on his death.

References

External links 
 

1879 births
1959 deaths
Companions of the Distinguished Service Order
British Army personnel of World War I
Baronets in the Baronetage of the United Kingdom
UK MPs 1910–1918
Conservative Party (UK) MPs for English constituencies
Deputy Lieutenants of Dorset
Queen's Own Dorset Yeomanry officers